Tommie Gorman (born April 1956) is a retired Irish journalist. He worked for RTÉ News and Current Affairs from 1980 to 2021. He was the former Northern Ireland editor for RTÉ.

He is known for his personal interviews with figures such as Seán Quinn, Gerry Adams and Roy Keane, the latter following the 2002 Saipan incident. He retired in April 2021.

Career
He began his journalistic work with the Western People newspaper in County Mayo, where he worked for journalist John Healy. He joined RTÉ in 1980 and became North-West correspondent. In 1989, he moved to Brussels to become Europe Editor, and was appointed Northern Ireland Editor in 2001.

In 1989, Tommie featured in a report on RTÉ Regional correspondents presented by Eithne Hand

Gorman has also made several documentaries. Many of these have been on a Northern Ireland topic.

Following the murder of Michaela McAreavey, Gorman went to Mauritius to cover the trial for RTÉ News.

In early 2021, it was announced that Gorman would retire in April 2021.

Interviews
Gorman is known for the 2002 interview with Republic of Ireland footballer Roy Keane after he quit in the build-up to the 2002 FIFA World Cup during which Gorman begged Keane to return. The interview was broadcast over a half-hour of television on 27 May 2002. It was the top television programme of May 2002, beating even coverage of the country's general election which had been held ten days earlier. Details of the interview were later circulated outside Ireland. Afterwards Gorman said Keane was "deeply emotional".

In January 2009, Gorman conducted an interview with Seán Quinn. The interview was a rare appearance in the media by Quinn. When the Quinn Group posted the interview on YouTube,  “Publicity-shy tycoon jumps on YouTube bandwagon” the video attracted 28 views, including two carried out for research purposes by the Irish Independent.

In December 2009, Gorman conducted a 29-minute interview with Gerry Adams, the President of Sinn Féin. The interview contained references to Adams's personal life and family background, including child abuse allegations surrounding family members.

Awards and honours
Gorman was awarded with European of the Year in 2001 for his work on radio and television reports on EU institutions. The award was presented to him in Dublin by President of Ireland Mary McAleese.

Gorman was given an honorary master's degree by NUI Galway in October 2009.

Earnings
In 2005 Gorman was ninth in RTÉ's top earners list, with a salary of 200,367. He offered a pay freeze in February 2009.

References

External links
 Gorman's view on 2007 Northern Ireland Assembly Elections at RTÉ.ie

1956 births
20th-century Irish people
21st-century Irish people
Living people
People from County Sligo
RTÉ newsreaders and journalists